Fissurellidea patagonica is a species of sea snail, a marine gastropod mollusk in the family Fissurellidae, the keyhole limpets and slit limpets.

Description
The size of the shell reaches 22. 5 mm.

Distribution
This species occurs in the Atlantic Ocean off Uruguay to Tierra del Fuego; off the Falklands

References

External links
 To Biodiversity Heritage Library (1 publication)
 To Encyclopedia of Life
 To World Register of Marine Species
 

Fissurellidae
Gastropods described in 1907